The Maison Fournaise ("House of Fournaise") is a restaurant and museum located on the Île des Impressionnistes, a long island in Seine river in Chatou, west of Paris.

History
In 1857, Alphonse Fournaise bought land in Chatou to open a boat rental, restaurant, and small hotel for the new tourist trade.  

Closed in 1906, the Maison Fournaise remained abandoned before being restored in 1990 on the initiative of the town of Chatou, with the assistance of American private funds from the Friends of French Art.  

This restaurant was meeting place of financial persons, politicians and painters of nearby places. That time Impressionist artist liked this restaurant because it was present near river, at this location reflection of sunshine on river's water was a pleasant site, open place and natural air.  

The restaurant was a favorite of Pierre-Auguste Renoir, who painted scenes of the restaurant including Lunch at the Restaurant Fournaise or The Rowers' Lunch (1879, Déjeuner chez Fournaise, Déjeuner au Restaurant Fournaise, Le Déjeuner au bord de la rivière, or Déjeuner des Rameurs) and Luncheon of the Boating Party (1881, Le déjeuner des canotiers) as well as several portraits of Fournaise family members and landscapes of the surrounding area.

Gallery

References

External links
 
 Restaurant de la Maison Fournaise
 The Fournaise Museum
 Friends of La Maison Fournaise

Museums in Yvelines
Restaurants disestablished in 1906
Impressionism
Pierre-Auguste Renoir
Art museums and galleries in Île-de-France
Buildings and structures in Yvelines
1857 establishments in France
1906 disestablishments in France
Art museums established in 1857
Restaurants established in 1857
Defunct restaurants in France